Warren Harding High School is a public high school in Bridgeport, Connecticut, United States. It is commonly called Harding High School.  Its cornerstone was laid on May 10, 1924, and the school opened on September 9, 1925. The school is named for then recently deceased President Warren G. Harding.

Athletics
The Presidents sports seasons are in the traditional fall/winter/spring format. Sports include football, soccer, volleyball, basketball, wrestling, baseball, golf, track, and softball.

Buildings
Original facility

The original school was designed by C. Wellington Walker, and was located at 1734 Central Avenue. Featuring Georgian style architecture and Greek columns, it was in service for 93 years.

Current facility

Built at a cost of $107 million the new building was completed in 2018 and is a four-story  square foot structure. It was built on a former General Electric factory site which underwent considerable environmental remediation. The building has many security features, including bulletproof glass and 130 security cameras.

Notable alumni

 John Edward Bagley (1979), professional basketball player
 Tony Elliott, professional football player
 Mike L. Jones (1985), professional football player
 Walt Kelly (1930), cartoonist, creator of Pogo
Fay Honey Knopp (1935), Quaker minister, peace and civil rights advocate, and prison abolitionist
Wes Matthews (attended Harding 1974–77), professional basketball player
 Wayne Moore (1949), Olympic gold medalist from the 1952 Summer Olympics
 Nejdra Nance, child abductee who received national attention for solving her own kidnapping 23 years later
 Charles Smith (1984), professional basketball player
 Samuel J. Tedesco, Mayor of Bridgeport (1957-1965), Lieutenant Governor of Connecticut (1963-1965), Judge of the Superior Court (1967-1980)

References

External links
 

Education in Bridgeport, Connecticut
Schools in Fairfield County, Connecticut
Educational institutions established in 1925
Public high schools in Connecticut
1925 establishments in Connecticut